Bhushan Subba (born 8 October 1994) is an Indian cricketer. He made his List A debut for Sikkim in the 2018–19 Vijay Hazare Trophy on 20 September 2018. He made his first-class debut on 9 December 2019, for Sikkim in the 2019–20 Ranji Trophy. He made his Twenty20 debut on 19 January 2021, for Sikkim in the 2020–21 Syed Mushtaq Ali Trophy.

References

External links
 

1994 births
Living people
Indian cricketers
Sikkim cricketers
Place of birth missing (living people)